There's Good in Everyone is a 1915 British silent romance film directed by Maurice Elvey and starring Elisabeth Risdon, Fred Groves and A.V. Bramble.

Cast
 Elisabeth Risdon - Beatrice Maybrook
 Fred Groves - Hon. Reginald
 A.V. Bramble - Marquis
 M. Gray Murray - Mr. Maybrook

External links

1915 films
British silent short films
1910s romance films
1910s English-language films
Films directed by Maurice Elvey
British black-and-white films
British romance films
1910s British films